Southern Shores is a town in Dare County, North Carolina, United States. It is located on the Outer Banks and the population was 3,107 at the 2020 census.

Geography
Southern Shores is located at  (36.124454, -75.732612).

Demographics

2020 census

As of the 2020 United States census, there were 3,090 people, 1,225 households, and 915 families residing in the town.

2000 census
As of the census of 2000, there were 2,201 people, 946 households, and 725 families residing in the town. The population density was 540.4 people per square mile (208.8/km). There were 1,921 housing units at an average density of 471.7 per square mile (182.2/km). The racial makeup of the town was 98.23% White, 0.09% African American, 0.23% Native American, 0.23% Asian, 0.09% Pacific Islander, 0.64% from other races, and 0.50% from two or more races. Hispanic or Latino of any race were 1.54% of the population.

There were 946 households, out of which 21.8% had children under the age of 18 living with them, 71.6% were married couples living together, 3.7% had a female householder with no husband present, and 23.3% were non-families. 20.2% of all households were made up of individuals, and 9.5% had someone living alone who was 65 years of age or older. The average household size was 2.33 and the average family size was 2.64.

In the town, the population was spread out, with 18.6% under the age of 18, 2.7% from 18 to 24, 17.4% from 25 to 44, 36.5% from 45 to 64, and 24.9% who were 65 years of age or older. The median age was 51 years. For every 100 females, there were 97.4 males. For every 100 females age 18 and over, there were 93.2 males.

The median income for a household in the town was $61,676, and the median income for a family was $68,250. Males had a median income of $41,563 versus $31,875 for females. The per capita income for the town was $35,933. About 1.6% of families and 3.1% of the population were below the poverty line, including 4.6% of those under age 18 and 0.8% of those age 65 or over.

Climate

According to the Trewartha climate classification system, Southern Shores, North Carolina has a humid subtropical climate with hot and humid summers, cool winters and year-around precipitation (Cfak). Cfak climates are characterized by all months having an average mean temperature > 32.0 °F (> 0.0 °C), at least eight months with an average mean temperature ≥ 50.0 °F (≥ 10.0 °C), at least one month with an average mean temperature ≥ 71.6 °F (≥ 22.0 °C) and no significant precipitation difference between seasons. During the summer months in Southern Shores, a cooling afternoon sea breeze is present on most days, but episodes of extreme heat and humidity can occur with heat index values ≥ 100 °F (≥ 38 °C). Southern Shores is prone to hurricane strikes, particularly during the Atlantic hurricane season which extends from June 1 through November 30, sharply peaking from late August through September. During the winter months, episodes of cold and wind can occur with wind chill values < 10 °F (< -12 °C). The plant hardiness zone in Southern Shores is 8b with an average annual extreme minimum air temperature of 16.3 °F (-8.7 °C). The average seasonal (Dec-Mar) snowfall total is < 2 inches (< 5 cm), and the average annual peak in nor'easter activity is in February.

Ecology

According to the A. W. Kuchler U.S. potential natural vegetation types, Southern Shores, North Carolina would have a dominant vegetation type of Live oak/Sea Oats Uniola paniculata (90) with a dominant vegetation form of Coastal Prairie (20).

Education
Residents are zoned to Dare County Schools. Zoned schools are Kitty Hawk Elementary School, First Flight Middle School, and First Flight High School. Prior to 2004, First Flight High zoned students were zoned to Manteo High School.

References

External links
 

Towns in Dare County, North Carolina
Towns in North Carolina
Beaches of North Carolina
Outer Banks
Beaches of Dare County, North Carolina